Bryoria nadvornikiana, commonly known as the spiny grey horsehair lichen or the blonde horsehair lichen, is a species of horsehair lichen in the family Parmeliaceae.

References

nadvornikiana
Lichen species
Lichens described in 1932
Lichens of Europe
Lichens of North America